Back to the Centre is a 1985 album by Irish singer/songwriter Paul Brady, his fourth solo album. Eric Clapton was a guest guitarist.

Track listing

"Walk The White Line" - 5:05  
"Wheel of Heartbreak" - 5:09  
"Deep In Your Heart" - 6:01  
"To Be The One" - 4:50  
"Follow On" - 4:16   
"Soulbeat" - 4:51 
"Airwaves" - 4:46  
"The Island" - 5:28 
"The Homes of Donegal" - 7:29

The recording session for the album also included an arrangement of the traditional song "The Green Fields of Canada" which appeared on the charity album Feed The Folk released in 1985 to raise money for Ethiopian famine. On the track Brady plays tin whistle, keyboards and sings.

Personnel
Paul Brady - vocals, guitar, bouzouki, keyboards, percussion, tin whistle
Ian Maidman - Overall production, bass, percussion, guitar, backing vocals
Eric Clapton, Phil Palmer - guitar
Larry Mullen, Jr., Liam Genockey, Ole Romo - drums
Betsy Cook, Kenny Craddock - keyboards
Mitt Gamon - harmonica
Loudon Wainwright - backing vocals
Phil Saatchi - backing vocals

References

External links
 Back to the Centre on Amazon

1985 albums
Paul Brady albums
Mercury Records albums